In mathematics, an alternating sign matrix is a square matrix of 0s, 1s, and −1s such that the sum of each row and column is 1 and the nonzero entries in each row and column alternate in sign. These matrices generalize permutation matrices and arise naturally when using Dodgson condensation to compute a determinant. They are also closely related to the six-vertex model with domain wall boundary conditions from statistical mechanics. They were first defined by William Mills, David Robbins, and Howard Rumsey in the former context.

Examples

A permutation matrix is an alternating sign matrix, and an alternating sign matrix is a permutation matrix if and only if no entry equals .

An example of an alternating sign matrix that is not a permutation matrix is

Alternating sign matrix theorem
The alternating sign matrix theorem states that the number of  alternating sign matrices is

The first few terms in this sequence for n = 0, 1, 2, 3, … are
1, 1, 2, 7, 42, 429, 7436, 218348, … .

This theorem was first proved by Doron Zeilberger in 1992.  In 1995, Greg Kuperberg gave a short proof based on the Yang–Baxter equation for the six-vertex model with domain-wall boundary conditions, that uses a determinant calculation due to Anatoli Izergin. In 2005, a third proof was given by Ilse Fischer using what is called the operator method.

Razumov–Stroganov problem

In 2001, A. Razumov and Y. Stroganov conjectured a connection between O(1) loop model, fully packed loop model (FPL) and ASMs.
This conjecture was proved in 2010 by Cantini and Sportiello.

References

Further reading
 Bressoud, David M., Proofs and Confirmations, MAA Spectrum, Mathematical Associations of America, Washington, D.C., 1999.
 Bressoud, David M. and Propp, James, How the alternating sign matrix conjecture was solved, Notices of the American Mathematical Society, 46 (1999), 637–646.
 Mills, William H., Robbins, David P., and Rumsey, Howard Jr., Proof of the Macdonald conjecture, Inventiones Mathematicae, 66 (1982), 73–87.
 Mills, William H., Robbins, David P., and Rumsey, Howard Jr., Alternating sign matrices and descending plane partitions, Journal of Combinatorial Theory, Series A, 34 (1983), 340–359.
 Propp, James, The many faces of alternating-sign matrices, Discrete Mathematics and Theoretical Computer Science, Special issue on Discrete Models: Combinatorics, Computation, and Geometry (July 2001).
 Razumov, A. V., Stroganov Yu. G., Combinatorial nature of ground state vector of O(1) loop model, Theor. Math. Phys., 138 (2004), 333–337.
 Razumov, A. V., Stroganov Yu. G., O(1) loop model with different boundary conditions and symmetry classes of alternating-sign matrices], Theor. Math. Phys., 142 (2005), 237–243, 
 Zeilberger, Doron, Proof of the refined alternating sign matrix conjecture, New York Journal of Mathematics 2 (1996), 59–68.

External links
 Alternating sign matrix entry in MathWorld
 Alternating sign matrices entry in the FindStat database

Matrices
Enumerative combinatorics